Steven Soliz, Jr. (born January 27, 1971) is an American former Major League Baseball bullpen coach for the Los Angeles Angels of Anaheim.  From 2003 to 2010, he was the Angels bullpen catcher. He played professionally from 1993 to 2000 in the Cleveland Indians and San Diego Padres farm systems.

References

External links

Retrosheet

1971 births
Living people
Buffalo Bisons (minor league) players
Major League Baseball bullpen catchers
Major League Baseball bullpen coaches
Anaheim Angels coaches
Los Angeles Angels coaches
Los Angeles Angels of Anaheim coaches
People from Ventura, California
Watertown Indians players
Canton-Akron Indians players
Kinston Indians players
Bakersfield Blaze players
Akron Aeros players
Las Vegas Stars (baseball) players
Mobile BayBears players
Yuma Bullfrogs players
Minor league baseball managers
Sportspeople from Ventura County, California